Sphingonaepiopsis is a genus of moths in the family Sphingidae.

Species
Sphingonaepiopsis asiatica Melichar & Řezáč, 2013
Sphingonaepiopsis ansorgei (Rothschild, 1904)
Sphingonaepiopsis gorgoniades (Hübner, 1819)
Sphingonaepiopsis gurkoi Melichar & Řezáč, 2013
Sphingonaepiopsis kuldjaensis (Graeser, 1892)
Sphingonaepiopsis malgassica (Clark, 1929)
Sphingonaepiopsis nana (Walker, 1856)
Sphingonaepiopsis obscurus (Mabille, 1880)
Sphingonaepiopsis pumilio (Boisduval, [1875])

 
Macroglossini
Taxa named by Hans Daniel Johan Wallengren
Moth genera